Kalle Rovanperä (born 1 October 2000) is a Finnish professional rally driver who competes in the World Rally Championship (WRC) for Toyota Gazoo Racing WRT, alongside co-driver Jonne Halttunen. He is the reigning World Champion. As the son of former WRC driver Harri Rovanperä, he garnered international attention by starting rallying at an exceptionally young age.

In , Rovanperä became the youngest driver to win a World Rally Championship event by winning the 2021 Rally Estonia. In , he became the youngest ever World Champion after winning the 2022 Rally New Zealand a day after his 22nd birthday.

Early life and background
Rovanperä was born in Jyväskylä in Central Finland. He garnered international attention at the age of eight, when a footage of him driving a rally car was uploaded to the Internet, and participated his first rally at just ten years old. Prior to his participation in the professional championships, he was coached by many compatriots, including Esapekka Lappi, who commented that a young Rovanperä already knew as much as him.

Career

2015–2017: Success in Latvia, two other national series, ERC and WRC debut
In 2015, at the age of 14, Rovanperä competed in Latvia where having a driver's license is not a requirement to take part in rallying. He won the Latvian rally championship with his Citroën C2 R2 Max car in the R2 class.

For the first three rallies of the 2016 Latvian rally series, Rovanperä drove a 300-horsepower four-wheel-drive Škoda Fabia S2000, which was a completely new WRC-2 class rally car with a two-litre naturally aspirated engine. He won the first rally, setting the fastest time at every stage. He finished as the runner-up the second rally despite a power steering issue. Rovanperä switched to a new Škoda Fabia R5 following another second-place finish in the Kurzeme rally. He scored four more podiums, including two victories for the rest of the season. Rovanperä eventually won the championship and became the youngest driver ever to win a national open class rally championship in any country at the age of 16.

In January 2017, the Finnish motorsport association AKK-Motorsport granted a 16-year-old Rovanperä special permission to take part in Finnish rally races and the Ralli SM national championship series. In addition to entering the rallies in the Finnish Rally Championship, he also participated in two other national championships: Latvia, Italy. Rovanperä also made his European Rally Championship debut in 2017 by entering the Rally Liepāja, where he finished second overall. He also successfully defended his title in Latvia by finishing every rally on the podium.

Having acquired his driving licence, Rovanperä made his WRC debut at the 2017 Wales Rally GB, driving an M-Sport-entered Ford Fiesta R5, as well as competing at the 2017 Rally Australia. He won the event in the WRC-2 category, becoming the youngest winner of a WRC-2 round, though he was the only contestant in the class.

2018–2019: Steady improvement and WRC-2 Pro crown

Rovanperä joined Škoda Motorsport for the 2018 season. He recorded two victories at the 2018 Wales Rally GB and the 2018 Rally Catalunya, completing the championship third. Rovanperä also contested some events in the Asia Pacific Championship series.

Rovanperä was retained by the team for the 2019 season. He took his first victory of the season at the 2019 Rally Chile, and took over the championship a round later at the 2019 Rally de Portugal. He would go on to win three more rallies during the rest of the season and eventually sealed the title at the 2019 Wales Rally GB. His only retirement of the season was at the 2019 Tour de Corse, where he crashed out during the ninth special stage.

2020–2021: Top tier debut and youngest WRC event winner

Rovanperä chose 69 as his car number. He scored his first podium at his second outing in the top class at the 2020 Rally Sweden by finishing third. At 19 years, 4 months and 16 days, Rovanperä became the youngest WRC podium finisher. Rovanperä eventually finished fifth at the end of season.

Rovanperä's 2021 campaign started with a fourth at the 2021 Monte Carlo Rally and a second at the 2021 Arctic Rally Finland, which was enough to lead the WRC championship for the first time in his career. Following a series of troublesome events, Rovanperä took his first WRC career victory at the 2021 Rally Estonia. The victory saw him become the youngest driver to win a World Rally Championship event at 21 years and 289 days, breaking the previous record of 22 years and 313 days held by his team boss Jari-Matti Latvala. Later in 2021, he also won the 2021 Acropolis Rally. Rovanperä eventually finished fourth at the conclusion of the championship.

2022: Youngest World Rally Champion
Rovanperä started  with a fourth place at the 2022 Monte Carlo Rally, before he went on to win a hat-trick events. Following a fifth place at the 2022 Rally Italia Sardegna, he secured back-to-back victories to build a commanding lead in the championship. Despite of a number of eventful rallies, he returned to form to claim his sixth rally of the season at the 2022 Rally New Zealand. The performance was enough to secure the first world title of his career.

Personal life
In June 2017, the Finnish transport safety agency Trafi granted Rovanperä special permission to apply for a driver's license when he turned 17. On 2 October 2017, a day after his 17th birthday, Rovanperä successfully completed the mandatory driving test after having completed the theory part beforehand.

Awards and honours
 Autosport Awards International Rally Driver of the Year: 2022

Rally victories

WRC victories

WRC-2 victories

WRC-2 Pro victories

Career results

WRC results
 
* Season still in progress.

WRC-2 results

WRC-2 Pro results

ERC results

References

External links 

  
 
 Kalle Rovanperä's e-wrc profile

2000 births
Living people
21st-century Finnish people
Finnish rally drivers
Škoda Motorsport drivers
Sportspeople from Jyväskylä
Toyota Gazoo Racing drivers
World Rally Champions
World Rally Championship drivers